Kollam Beach, also known as Mahatma Gandhi Beach, is a beach at Kollam city in the Indian state of Kerala. Kollam Beach is the first 'Beach Wedding Destination' in Kerala.

The beach also features a park of international standard, the Mahatma Gandhi Park, which was inaugurated on 1January 1961 by the then Vice President of India, Zakir Hussain. Kollam beach is one among the few beaches in Kerala with a lifeguard outpost. Lifeguards were stationed at the beach from 2005.  Kovalam, Kollam is one among the three beaches in south Kerala with lifeguard outposts.

Overview

Kollam Port is one of the oldest and most important ports for the international cashew trade on the Malabar Coast of the Arabian Sea. , Kollam Port was the second largest port in Kerala after Cochin Port.

Kollam was once a favourite settlement of the Portuguese, the Dutch and the English in succession before Independence.

The exotic location and backwaters makes Kollam Beach  one of Kerala's most popular tourist attractions.

Marine Aquarium
On 22June 2014, construction work started on a marine aquarium at Kollam Beach, which was first of its kind in the state of Kerala. The Harbour Engineering Department is constructing the aquarium at the eastern side of the beach on behalf of Kollam Municipal Corporation. The foundation stone for the project was laid in March and is expected to complete by December 2014. It will be a single storey aquarium with 40 large tanks to hold a diverse collection of marine life and will be an added attraction for visitors to Kollam beach.

Tangasseri Lighthouse

The  Tangasseri lighthouse built in 1902 is a major landmark at the beach.

Historic monuments
Ruins of Portuguese / Dutch forts and 18th-century churches near the port remain as a memento of the Portuguese and Dutch rule of the area.

Gallery

Events in Kollam
 President's Trophy Boat Race
 Kollam pooram

Other renowned beaches in Kerala
 Kovalam
 Paravur Thekkumbhagam
 Varkala

References

External links

Tourist attractions in Kollam
Beaches of Kollam